Caladenia subglabriphylla is a plant in the orchid family Orchidaceae and is endemic to southern Australia. It was first formally described in 2014 by Robert Bates who gave it the name Arachnorchis subglabriphylla and published the description in Australian Orchid Review. In 2015 Mark Clements changed the name to Caladenia subglabriphylla and published the change in American Journal of Botany. The specific epithet (subglabriphylla) is derived from the Latin prefix sub- meaning "somewhat" or "less than", the word glabrum meaning "hairless", "bald" or "smooth" and the Ancient Greek word phyllon meaning "leaf", hence "almost hairless leaf".

References

subglabriphylla
Endemic orchids of Australia
Orchids of South Australia
Plants described in 2014
Taxa named by Robert John Bates